European Court may refer to:

 Court of Justice of the European Union, the judiciary of the European Union, based in Luxembourg
 European Court of Justice (ECJ), the EU's highest court, established in 1952
 General Court (European Union), established in 1989
 European Union Civil Service Tribunal, established in 2005
 European Court of Auditors, an institution of the European Union, established in 1977
 European Court of Human Rights, an institution based in Strasbourg for the hearing of human rights complaints from Council of Europe member states; unrelated to the European Union; established in 1959
 Royal courts in Europe

See also
 Relationship between the European Court of Justice and European Court of Human Rights